is a passenger railway station in the city of Kitaibaraki, Ibaraki Prefecture, Japan, operated by East Japan Railway Company (JR East).

Lines
Isohara Station is served by the Joban Line, and is located 171.6 km from the official starting point of the line at Nippori Station.

Station layout
The station consists of two elevated opposed side platforms. The station building is elevated to the level of the platforms; however, connection between the platforms is made an overhead walkway. The station is staffed. Nanatsu no Ko is used as the departure melody.

Platforms

History
Isohara Station was opened on 25 February 1897. The station was absorbed into the JR East network upon the privatization of Japanese National Railways (JNR) on 1 April 1987. It was rebuilt as an elevated station building in October 1997.

Passenger statistics
In fiscal 2019, the station was used by an average of 1697 passengers daily (boarding passengers only).

Surrounding area
Kita-Ibaraki Post Office 

Isohara Industrial Park

See also
 List of railway stations in Japan

References

External links
 
  

Railway stations in Ibaraki Prefecture
Jōban Line
Railway stations in Japan opened in 1897
Kitaibaraki, Ibaraki